The National Archives Building is the building of the Government Museum in Jakarta, Indonesia. The building, formerly a late 18th-century private residence of Governor-General Reinier de Klerk, is part of the cultural heritage of Jakarta. The house is an archetypal Indies-Style house of the earliest period.

References

Cited works
 

18th-century establishments in the Dutch Empire
Museums in Jakarta
Museums established in 1998
Colonial architecture in Jakarta
Buildings and structures in Jakarta
Cultural Properties of Indonesia in Jakarta
Landhuizen